Kurt von Falkowski (3 November 1886 – 1 April 1953) was a Generalmajor in the Luftwaffe during World War II.

Biography 
Kurt von Falkowski was born in Metz, Lorraine. During World War I, he served as an officer in the artillery. In 1935, Falkowski was appointed commander of the V Luftzeuggruppe in Munich.

From December 1936 until March 1941, von Falkowski was in charge of Wehrbereichskommando Passau.

In March 1941, Kurt von Falkowski assumed command of the Brigade Luftwaffen-Bau-I. Falkowski was promoted Generalmajor in November 1941.

Kurt von Falkowski died on 1 April 1953, in Einbeck.

Awards and decorations
 Ritterkreuz des Königlichen Hausorden von Hohenzollern mit Schwertern
 1914 EK I
 1914 EK II
 Ehrenkreuz für Frontkämpfer
 Wehrmacht-Dienstauszeichnung IV. bis I. Klasse
 Medaille zur Erinnerung an den 01.10.1938
 Kriegsverdienstkreuz II. Klasse mit Schwertern
 Kriegsverdienstkreuz I. Klasse mit Schwertern

References

Bibliography

 Karl-Friedrich Hildebrand: Die Generale der deutschen Luftwaffe 1935–1945, Biblio Verlag, Osnabrück, 1992.

External links
 Kurt von Falkowski on balsi.de.
 Falkowski on Axis Biographical Research

1886 births
1953 deaths
Luftwaffe World War II generals
Recipients of the Iron Cross (1914), 1st class
Military personnel from Metz
People from Alsace-Lorraine
Prussian Army personnel
German police officers
Major generals of the Luftwaffe